Sir William Wentworth (1562-1614) was an English landowner.

He was born in 1562, the son of Thomas Wentworth and Margaret Gascoigne or Gascoyne, heiress of Gawthorpe. A story was told of Wentworth's visit to Bolling Hall and a vision concerning St Ann's well at Buxton.

His homes were Gawthorpe Hall (demolished) near Harewood House, and Wentworth Woodhouse, near Rotherham. He became High Sheriff of Yorkshire, and acquired a baronet's title on 20 June 1611.

Marriage and family
He married Anne Atkins, daughter of Sir Robert Atkins of Stowell, Gloucestershire. Their eight sons included:
 Thomas Wentworth, 1st Earl of Strafford
 William Wentworth
 George Wentworth (of Wentworth Woodhouse)

References

External links
 Remains of Gawthorpe Hall discovered in Yorkshire

16th-century English people
Baronets in the Baronetage of England
1562 births
1614 deaths